Simon Michael Fox (born 28 August 1977) is an English former professional footballer who played as a forward in the Football League for Brighton & Hove Albion.

Life and career
Fox was born in 1977 in Basingstoke, Hampshire, and played youth football for Basingstoke Town and Fleet Town before signing for Brighton & Hove Albion as a schoolboy. He made his first-team debut on 23 April 1994, at the age of 16 years 238 days, in a Football League Second Division match at home to Fulham, becoming the youngest player to play in a competitive match for the club in peacetime. He turned professional in 1995, and made 24 appearances before being released at the end of the 1996–97 season. He went on to play non-league football for clubs including Hastings Town, St Leonards and Rye & Iden United.

Fox's older brother Mark played alongside him for Brighton & Hove Albion and for St Leonards.

References

1977 births
Living people
Sportspeople from Basingstoke
English footballers
Association football forwards
Basingstoke Town F.C. players
Fleet Town F.C. players
Brighton & Hove Albion F.C. players
Hastings United F.C. players
St. Leonards F.C. players
Rye United F.C. players
English Football League players
Southern Football League players
Footballers from Hampshire